The 7x61mm Sharpe & Hart Magnum belted cartridge (A.K.A. 7mm S&H Super) was developed by Philip B. Sharpe and Richard (Dick) Hart in the 1950s. Some articles claim it was based on the .300 H&H Magnum case, while others claim it was based on the 7x61 MAS M1907 case. 

In 1953 Sharpe & Hart traveled to Scandinavia, where they developed the cartridge. Schultz & Larsen of Denmark chambered the cartridge in their bolt-action rifles. Norma manufactured commercial ammunition, but later discontinued the line. While the 7x61mm S&H proved to be popular, mostly outside of the United States, it led was overshadowed once the 7mm Remington Magnum was released. While commercial brass is no longer produced on a large scale, ammunition and cases are available from some custom manufacturers. Reloaders have a variety of bullets to choose from, and Hornady lists load data for the cartridge. Reloaders should be aware of whether their rifle does, or does not, have freebore before using load data developed with more modern components. Cases can also be formed from 7mm Remington Magnum cases.

References

Pistol and rifle cartridges